Joseph-Antoine Bell (born 8 October 1954), sometimes referred to as JoJo Bell, is a Cameroonian former professional footballer who played as a goalkeeper. In a 20-year career, he played in his native Cameroon as well as in the Ivory Coast and Egypt before moving to France, where he played for several top-level clubs including Marseille, Bordeaux and eventually ending his playing career with Saint-Étienne. He represented the national team in three World Cups (1982, 1990, 1994), the 1984 Summer Olympics and several African Cup of Nations.

Club career 
Bell was born in Mouandé. He started his career in Eclair Douale then Oryx Douala and Prisons Buea beforeUnion Douala in Cameroon, where he spent the years 1975 to 1981. He then moved to Africa Sports National, staying there for two seasons. From 1983 to 1985 he played for Al-Mokawloon al-Arab in Egypt.

By the time he went to France to play, he was already 31 years old. He played for Olympique de Marseille from 1985 to 1988, playing 36, 38, and 35 league matches in each of his three seasons there. He then spent one season at Sporting Toulon Var, playing 31 matches. Two years at FC Girondins de Bordeaux followed, where he played 38 matches in 1989–90 and 37 matches in 1990–91. He ended his playing career with AS Saint-Étienne, where he played 35 matches in 1991–92 and 38 matches in 1992–93, but only 26 matches in 1993–94.

Bell, in joining the campaign United Against Malaria in 2009, stated that "malaria ... affected his playing".

International career 
For the national team, Bell was in the squads at the 1982 and 1990 FIFA World Cup but did not play any matches. He was also selected for the squad for the 1994 FIFA World Cup where he eventually made his debut, playing in two of Cameroon's group matches. After Cameroon's elimination in 1994, enraged fans set fire on Bell's house in Douala. Bell also played at the 1984 Summer Olympics, and was on Cameroon's winning team in the 1984 and 1988 African Cup of Nations. At international level, though, he was second-choice goalkeeper after Thomas N'Kono for many years.

Style of play 
Considered to be one of the greatest African goalkeepers of all time, Bell often acted as a sweeper-keeper, and was known for his ability to rush out of the box to sweep up the ball when his team played with a high defensive line.

Honours

Club 
Al-Mokawloon al-Arab
 African Cup Winners' Cup: 1982, 1983
 Egyptian Premier League: 1983

Individual 
Bell was named "African Goalkeeper of the Century" by IFFHS, as part of their "Century Elections". Cameroon had three goalkeepers among the top six, with Thomas N'Kono being second and Jacques Songo'o being sixth. Sadok Attouga was third, Badou Ezzaki was fourth and Mwemba Kazadi was fifth.

References 

1954 births
Living people
Cameroonian footballers
Cameroon international footballers
Association football goalkeepers
Ligue 1 players
Olympique de Marseille players
Expatriate footballers in France
SC Toulon players
FC Girondins de Bordeaux players
AS Saint-Étienne players
Olympic footballers of Cameroon
Footballers at the 1984 Summer Olympics
1982 FIFA World Cup players
1990 FIFA World Cup players
Cameroonian expatriate sportspeople in Egypt
Cameroonian expatriate sportspeople in France
Cameroonian expatriate sportspeople in Ivory Coast
1994 FIFA World Cup players
1984 African Cup of Nations players
1988 African Cup of Nations players
1992 African Cup of Nations players
Africa Cup of Nations-winning players
Al Mokawloon Al Arab SC players
Africa Sports d'Abidjan players
Expatriate footballers in Ivory Coast
Expatriate footballers in Egypt
Cameroonian expatriate footballers